Paul John Dalistan Lee (born February 14, 1989) is a Filipino professional basketball player for the Magnolia Hotshots of the Philippine Basketball Association (PBA). He was drafted 2nd overall by Rain or Shine in the 2011 PBA draft. He earned nicknames like Angas ng Tondo and Leethal Weapon.

Amateur career

High school
When he was a high school freshman in San Sebastian College – Recoletos, he was discovered when he was playing in the school’s intramurals. The coach spotted him, made him try out and placed him in the lineup the following year. The San Sebastian Staglets would go on to win the NCAA Juniors Championship in his senior year.

College
In 2007, he was recruited by then coach Dindo Pumaren of the University of the East, which at that time had formidable backcourt players like Raphy Reyes, Paul Zamar, James Martinez and Marcy Arellano. His role during that time was with the second squad. He was known as the 6th man, the main replacement for then King Warrior Marcy Arellano. In 2009, his game flourished when Lawrence Chongson took over to coach the team. Chongson later became his adviser, and currently an agent, until his death in 2021.

He received the Most Improved Player award in UAAP Season 72. He then became a part of Mythical Team during the UAAP Season 73.

He also played for Cobra Energy Drink Iron Men in the Philippine Basketball League and later in the PBA Developmental League coached by Chongson.

In his last year in UE, he was playing with an injury, but he didn't want anybody to know about it.

Professional career

Rain or Shine Elasto Painters (2011–2016)

He was picked 2nd overall by Rain or Shine during the 2011 PBA draft. In his PBA debut, Paul Lee recorded 17 points, 2 rebounds and 4 assists in 25 minutes of playing time on a 107–100 win over the Alaska Aces.  The following game, Paul Lee had another strong game having recorded 17 points and 5 rebounds in 30 minutes of playing time in a 100–94 win over the B-Meg Llamados. By the end of the 2011–12 PBA season, he was awarded Rookie of the Year, and won his first ever PBA championship with the Elasto Painters, though he did not play in the championship series due to injury.

In 2014, he requested the Rain or Shine management to trade him by personally calling up coach Yeng Guiao. However, Guiao and the Rain or Shine management are hell bent on keeping him at all cost. After Lee returned from Spain following his Gilas stint in the 2014 FIBA Basketball World Cup, he went to a sabbatical by not showing up to Rain or Shine practice or even talking to the media, creating speculations of him pushing through signing up with another team. A few days later, he finally showed up, and after a heart-to-heart talk with coach Yeng Guiao, he finally decided to stay with the Elasto Painters. On September 19, 2014, he, together with his agent Lawrence Chongson, signed a 2-year max deal to stay with Rain or Shine.

Magnolia Star Hotshots (2016–present)

On October 13, 2016, Paul Lee was sent to Star Hotshots on a blockbuster trade in exchange for star shooting guard James Yap in one of the biggest deal in PBA history that led to shocking reactions from basketball fans.

PBA career statistics

As of the end of 2021 season

Season-by-season averages

|-
| align=left | 
| align=left | Rain or Shine
| 46 || 27.5 || .465 || .344 || .826 || 3.7 || 4.1 || .8 || .0 || 13.9
|-
| align=left | 
| align=left | Rain or Shine
| 38 || 25.5 || .374 || .331 || .717 || 4.2 || 3.6 || .8 || .1 || 11.6
|-
| align=left | 
| align=left | Rain or Shine
| 61 || 25.8 || .403 || .362 || .824 || 3.2 || 2.7 || .7 || .1 || 13.0
|-
| align=left | 
| align=left | Rain or Shine
| 53 || 27.6 || .409 || .395 || .843 || 4.5 || 3.3 || .8 || .0 || 15.6
|-
| align=left | 
| align=left | Rain or Shine
| 35 || 21.2 || .418 || .319 || .929 || 2.7 || 2.5 || .6 || .0 || 10.3
|-
| align=left | 
| align=left | Star
| 51 || 29.8 || .387 || .331 || .847 || 3.7 || 3.3 || .8 || .0 || 12.5
|-
| align=left| 
| align=left | Magnolia
| 52 || 28.9 || .388 || .357 || .833 || 3.9 || 3.3 || 1.1 || .1 || 15.3 
|-
| align=left | 
| align=left | Magnolia
| 53 || 27.7 || .396 || .335 || .859 || 4.4 || 3.6 || .5 || .1 || 14.2
|-
| align=left | 
| align=left | Magnolia
| 12 || 30.4 || .447 || .404 || .889 || 4.0 || 3.3 || 1.1 || .1 || 19.7
|-
| align=left | 
| align=left | Magnolia
| 41 || 29.5 || .356 || .298 || .873 || 2.9 || 2.6 || .7 || .1 || 15.5
|-class=sortbottom
| align=center colspan=2 | Career
| 442 || 27.3 || .399 || .347 || .840 || 3.7 || 3.2 || .8 || .1 || 13.8

National team career
Lee was officially included in the roster that competed in the 2014 FIBA Basketball World Cup. He also led the team to a bronze medal finish in the 2014 FIBA Asia Cup after converting three crucial free-throws with no time remaining against host China.

References

1989 births
Living people
2014 FIBA Basketball World Cup players
2019 FIBA Basketball World Cup players
Asian Games competitors for the Philippines
Basketball players at the 2014 Asian Games
Basketball players at the 2018 Asian Games
Basketball players from Manila
Filipino men's basketball players
Magnolia Hotshots players
People from Tondo, Manila
Philippine Basketball Association All-Stars
Philippines men's national basketball team players
Point guards
Rain or Shine Elasto Painters draft picks
Rain or Shine Elasto Painters players
San Sebastian College – Recoletos alumni
Shooting guards
UE Red Warriors basketball players